Hi Gang! is a 1941 British comedy film directed by Marcel Varnel and starring Bebe Daniels, Ben Lyon and Vic Oliver.

Production
It was a spin-off from the popular BBC radio series Hi Gang!. It was made by Gainsborough Pictures at Lime Grove Studios. The film's art direction was by Walter W. Murton.

Plot
Two married reporters (Daniels and Lyon) in New York City working for rival radio networks engage in cut-throat competition, assisted by an incompetent with big ideas (Oliver). A publicity stunt by the couple to adopt a British evacuee boy live on air goes wrong and they end up adopting Albert (Moffatt) a rowdy pub landlord's son and his cantankerous Uncle Jerry (Marriott). The final third of the film sees them all travel to England in the mistaken belief that Albert is the son of Lord Amersham.

Cast

References

Bibliography
 Cook, Pam. Gainsborough Pictures. Cassell, 1997.

External links
 

1941 films
1941 comedy films
1940s English-language films
Films directed by Marcel Varnel
British comedy films
British films set in New York City
Films set in London
Gainsborough Pictures films
Films shot at Lime Grove Studios
British black-and-white films
Publicity stunts in fiction
1940s British films